The Mediterranean-Niger-Railway (MN) (French: Chemins de Fer de la Méditerranée au Niger) was a railway in Western Africa.

The Mediterrean-Niger Railway was built between the coal mining region near Bou Arfa in the east of Morocco and the Algerian rail system at Oujda, completed as a standard gauge route between Oran and Oujda in 1922, while Fes was reached in 1934.

In 1940/41 construction was begun on the Algerian segment of the Mediterranean-Niger-Railway as part of the Trans-Saharan Railway.  The line made a connection with the Moroccan segment, which had been completed in 1931, at Bou Arfa and continued into Algeria to connect with the  narrow gauge line Oran - Colomb-Béchar built in 1910.

In 1963 Morocco nationalized its railroad system under the name of Moroccan Railways (Office National des Chemins de Fer du Maroc ONCF). MN was liquidated. The part of MN from the Southern border to Colomb-Béchar was closed. Colomb-Béchar was still reached by the narrow gauge line.

References 
 Bejui, Dominique und Pascal: Exploits et fantasmes transsahariens : 80 ans de traversées sahariennes abouties ou rêvées en auto, en camion, en train et en avion. Chanac: La Regordane, 1994. 
 Guide Michelin, 1956.
 Lartilleux: Géographie des chemins de fer français. vol. 3. Chaix, 1949.
 Pottier, René: Le Transsaharien - Liaison d'Empire. Sorlot, 1941.
 Georges Bouchet: Les voies ferrées de pénétration sahariennes hors Algérie : Le Transsaharien
 List of sources in Mali
 Jean-Claude Faur, "La mise en valeur ferroviaire de l'AOF (1880-1939)" (Universite de Paris: Thèse de doctorat, Faculté de Lettres, 1969)

Railway lines in Algeria
Railway lines in Morocco
History of rail transport in Morocco
Standard gauge railways in Africa